John Richard Williams (born 1948) was Archdeacon of Switzerland from 2004 to 2006.

Williams was educated at Rhodes University and King's College, London and ordained in 1974.

Notes

1948 births
Alumni of King's College London
Rhodes University alumni
Archdeacons of Switzerland
20th-century English Anglican priests
21st-century Anglican priests
Living people